The Kirtan Ghosha is a collection of poetical works, primarily composed by the medieval saint Srimanta Sankardev in the Brajavali language. It was meant for community singing in the Ekasarana religion. Its importance in the religion is second only to the primary text, the Bhagavat of Sankardeva.

Texual history
The text of the kirtan ghoxa consists of twenty six sections and thirty one kirtans (or narratives of Krishna).  Sankardev had instructed Madhabdev during his last visit to Patbausi to compile the kirtans that were scattered then at different places—and they were posthumously compiled into a single text by Ramcharan Thakur, the nephew of Madhabdev. All the kirtans were composed by Srimanta Sankardeva, except for one by Ratnakar Kandali and another by Madhabdeva. Two of Sankardeva's kirtans were later additions to Ramcharan Thakur's compilation. In some versions, there is an additional kirtan composed by Sridhar Kandali.

Texual description
Each kirtan consists of a ghoxa or refrain followed by a number of verses, called padas, written in different meters. Some of the meters used, with examples

namo goparupi meghasama syama tanu |
gawe pitvastra hate singa veta venu ||

Jhuna
 
 pitavastra sobhe syamala kaya |
tadita jadita jalada praya ||

Laghu payara

sundara hasikaka alpa hasa |
caru syama tanu pitabasa ||

Dulari

pache trinayana             divya upavana
       dekhilanta vidyamana |
phala phala dhari           jakamaka kari
       ache yata vriksamana ||

Chabi
 
hena maha divyavana         dekhilanta trinayana
       divya kanya eka ache tate |
koti lakshmi sama nohe      katashe trailokya mohe
       bhanta kheri kheli duyo hate ||

The Kirtans history

 Chaturvimsati avatara varnana
 Pasanda mardana
 Namaparadha
 Dhyana Varnana
 Ajamilopakhyana
 Prahlada carita
 Haramohana
 Balichalana
 Gajendropakhyana
 Sisulila
 Rasa krida
 Kamsa vadha
 Gopi udhava samvada
 Kujir vancha purana
 Akrurar vancha purana
 Jarasandhar yuddha
 Kaalyavana vadha
 Mucukunda stuti
 Syamanta harana
 Naradar krishna darsana
 Vipra putra anayana
 Damodara upakhyana
 Daivakir putra anayana
 Veda stuti
 Krishna lilamala
 Srikrishnar vaikuntha prayana
 Bhagavatar tatparya
 Uresa varnana

Notes

References

External links
 Text of the Kirtan Ghosa, Naam Ghosa

Ekasarana Dharma
Kirtan